The 2015 FIFA Club World Cup (officially known as the FIFA Club World Cup Japan 2015 presented by Alibaba E-Auto for sponsorship reasons) was the 12th edition of the FIFA Club World Cup, a FIFA-organised international club football tournament between the winners of the six continental confederations, as well as the host nation's league champions. The tournament was hosted by Japan between 10 and 20 December 2015.

Defending champions Real Madrid did not qualify as they were eliminated in the semi-finals of the 2014–15 UEFA Champions League. The eventual winners of that competition, Barcelona, went on to win a record third Club World Cup title, beating Guangzhou Evergrande 3–0 in the semi-finals before beating River Plate by the same margin in the final.

Host bids
The application process for the 2015–2016 as well as the 2017–2018 editions, i.e. two hosts, each hosting two years, began in February 2014. Member associations interested in hosting had to submit a declaration of interest by 30 March 2014, and provide the complete set of bidding documents by 25 August 2014. The FIFA Executive Committee was to select the hosts at their meeting in Morocco in December 2014. However, no such decision regarding the 2015–2016 host was made until 2015.

The following countries expressed an interest in bidding to host the tournament:
 (withdrew interest in November 2014)

Japan was officially confirmed as the host of the 2015 and 2016 tournaments on 23 April 2015.

Proposed change to format
Under a proposed change to the competition, led by the Oceania Football Confederation, the new format would mean a removal of the knockout rounds for the quarter-finals and play-off round, replacing it with two round-robin groups of three teams, consisting of two teams from the host nation and the champions of AFC, CAF, CONCACAF, and OFC, with the group winners advancing to the semi-finals to play the champions of CONMEBOL and UEFA. This would allow for all teams to play at least two matches, avoiding the current situation where the loser of the play-off round would play only one match. However, this proposal was not implemented.

Qualified teams

Notes

Venues
On 22 May 2015, Nagai Stadium in Osaka and International Stadium Yokohama in Yokohama were named as the two venues that would be used in the tournament.

Match officials
The appointed match officials were:

Squads

Each team had to name a 23-man squad (three of whom had to be goalkeepers) by the FIFA deadline of 30 November 2015. The squads of six of the seven teams were released by FIFA on 3 December 2015 (except Sanfrecce Hiroshima, who only confirmed their place in the tournament on 5 December 2015). Injury replacements were allowed until 24 hours before the team's first match.

Matches
The schedule of the tournament, together with the emblem, was unveiled on 24 August 2015.

A draw was held on 23 September 2015, 14:00 CEST (UTC+2), at the FIFA headquarters in Zürich, Switzerland, to determine the positions in the bracket for the three teams which enter the quarter-finals.

If a match was tied after normal playing time:
For elimination matches, extra time was played. If still tied after extra time, a penalty shoot-out was held to determine the winner.
For the matches for fifth place and third place, no extra time was played, and a penalty shoot-out was held to determine the winner.

All times are local, JST (UTC+9).

Play-off for quarter-finals

Quarter-finals

Match for fifth place

Semi-finals

Match for third place

Final

Goalscorers

Awards

The following awards were given at the conclusion of the tournament.

FIFA also named a man of the match for the best player in each game at the tournament.

References

External links
FIFA Club World Cup Japan 2015, FIFA.com
FIFA Technical Report

 
2015
2015 in association football
2015
2015 in Japanese football